Sidi Amar Kammoun mosque (arabic: جامع سيدي عمر كمون) is one of the most important and famous mosques of the medina of Sfax.

Localisation 
The mosque is located in Borj Ennar Street near Bab Diwan. It is integrated as part of the Sidi Amar Kammoun mausoleum.

History 
The first part of the mosque was built in 1630 following the orders of Mourad Bey. The minaret was added later by the saint Sidi Amar Kammoun himself in 1659.

Apart of its religious function, the building played a huge defensive role during wars as it provided the soldiers with a full clear view of the coastal facade of the medina from the minaret.

See also 

 Sidi Amar Kammoun Mausoleum

References 

Mosques in Sfax